Eupithecia neosatyrata is a moth in the family Geometridae. It is found in Japan.

References

Moths described in 1979
neosatyrata
Moths of Japan